Emanu-El (also spelled Emanuel) ( imanuél, "God [is] with us", from עִמָּנוּ imánu, "with us" + אֵל el, "God"), or Temple Emanuel, may refer to the following Jewish synagogues:

Australia
Emanuel Synagogue (Sydney, New South Wales)

Canada
Congregation Emanu-El (Victoria, British Columbia)
Temple Emanu-El-Beth Sholom (Westmount, Quebec)
Temple Emau-El (Toronto, Ontario)

United States

Alabama
Temple Emanu-El (Birmingham, Alabama)

Arizona
Temple Emanu-El (Tucson)
Temple Emanuel of Tempe

California
Congregation Emanu-El (San Francisco)
Temple Emanuel (Beverly Hills, California)

Colorado
Temple Emanuel (Denver)
Temple Emanuel (Pueblo, Colorado), NRHP-listed

Florida
Temple Emanu-El (Palm Beach, Florida)

Hawaii
Temple Emanu-El (Honolulu)

Iowa
Temple Emanuel (Davenport, Iowa)

Massachusetts
Temple Emanuel Sinai (Worcester, Massachusetts)

Michigan
Temple Emanuel (Grand Rapids, Michigan)

Missouri
Temple Emanuel (Creve Coeur, Missouri)

Montana
Temple Emanu-El (Helena, Montana)

New Jersey
Congregation Kol Ami, formerly Temple Emanuel (Cherry Hill)
Temple Emanu-El of West Essex

New York
Temple Emanu-El (Long Beach, New York)
Congregation Emanu-El of New York
Temple Emanu-El (Staten Island, New York)

North Carolina
Congregation Emanuel (Statesville, North Carolina)

Texas
Temple Emanuel (Beaumont, Texas)
Temple Emanu-El (Dallas)
Congregation Emanu El (Houston, Texas)

Wisconsin
Congregation Emanu-El B'ne Jeshurun

See also
 Emanuel (disambiguation)
 Emmanuel (disambiguation)
 Immanuel (disambiguation)

References